Raj Kaushal (15 August 1970 – 30  June 2021) was an Indian director, producer who was active during the 1990s and mid 2000s. He was married to actress and TV presenter Mandira Bedi. He died on 30 June 2021 due to a heart attack.

Filmography

References

External links
 

1971 births
2021 deaths
Film directors from Kolkata
Film producers from Kolkata
Indian action choreographers
Place of birth missing
Place of death missing
Hindi-language film directors
Hindi film producers
21st-century Indian film directors
Indian Hindus